The 1986 season in Swedish football, starting January 1986 and ending December 1986:

Honours

Official titles

Competitions

Promotions, relegations and qualifications

Promotions

League transfers

Relegations

International qualifications

Domestic results

Allsvenskan 1986

Allsvenskan play-off 1986 
Semi-finals

Final

Division 2 Norra 1986

Division 2 Södra 1986

Division 1 promotion play-off 1986

Svenska Cupen 1985–86 
Final

National team results

Notes

References 
Print

Online

 
Seasons in Swedish football